Gone to Earth is a 1917 romance novel by the British writer Mary Webb. It was her second novel following her debut The Golden Arrow the previous year. It received positive reviews and Rebecca West described it as her book of the year. It is set in Shropshire around Long Mynd and Wenlock Edge. In 1935 it was one of the first batch of Penguin Books published.

Film adaptation
In 1950 the novel was adapted into the film Gone to Earth directed by Michael Powell and Emeric Pressburger and starring Jennifer Jones, David Farrar and Cyril Cusack.

References

Bibliography
 Baldick, Chris. Literature of the 1920s: Writers Among the Ruins, Volume 3. Edinburgh University Press, 2015.
 Goble, Alan. The Complete Index to Literary Sources in Film. Walter de Gruyter, 1999.
 Radford, Andrew. The Lost Girls: Demeter-Persephone and the Literary Imagination, 1850-1930. BRILL, 2007.
 Stringer, Jenny & Sutherland, John. The Oxford Companion to Twentieth-century Literature in English. Oxford University Press, 1996.
 Sutherland, John. Lives of the Novelists: A History of Fiction in 294 Lives. Profile Books, 2011.

1917 British novels
Novels by Mary Webb
British romance novels
Constable & Co. books
Novels set in Shropshire
British novels adapted into films